The Dhammapada (Pāli) is a collection of sayings of the Buddha in verse form and one of the most widely read and best known Buddhist scriptures. The original version of the Dhammapada is in the Khuddaka Nikaya, a division of the Pali Canon of Theravada Buddhism.

The Buddhist scholar and commentator Buddhaghosa explains that each saying recorded in the collection was made on a different occasion in response to a unique situation that had arisen in the life of the Buddha and his monastic community. His translation of the commentary, the Dhammapada Atthakatha, presents the details of these events and is a rich source of legend for the life and times of the Buddha.

Etymology
The title "Dhammapada" is a compound term composed of dhamma and pada, each word having a number of denotations and connotations.  Generally, dhamma can refer to the Buddha's "doctrine" or an "eternal truth" or "righteousness" or all "phenomena"; at its root, pada means "foot"  and thus by extension, especially in this context, means either "path" or "verse" (cf. "prosodic foot") or both.  English translations of this text's title have used various combinations of these and related words.

History 
According to tradition, the Dhammapada's verses were spoken by the Buddha on various occasions. Glenn Wallis states: "By distilling the complex models, theories, rhetorical style and sheer volume of the Buddha's teachings into concise, crystalline verses, the Dhammapada makes the Buddhist way of life available to anyone...In fact, it is possible that the very source of the Dhammapada in the third century B.C.E. is traceable to the need of the early Buddhist communities in India to laicize the ascetic impetus of the Buddha's original words." The text is part of the Khuddaka Nikaya of the Sutta Pitaka, although over half of the verses exist in other parts of the Pali Canon.  A 4th or 5th century CE commentary attributed to Buddhaghosa includes 305 stories which give context to the verses.

Although the Pāli edition is the best-known, a number of other versions are known:
 "Gāndhārī Dharmapada" – a version possibly of Dharmaguptaka or Kāśyapīya origin in Gāndhārī written in Kharosthi script
 "Patna Dharmapada" – a version in Buddhist Hybrid Sanskrit, most likely Sammatiya
 "Udānavarga" – a seemingly related Mula-Sarvastivada or Sarvastivada text in
 3 Sanskrit versions
 a Tibetan translation, which is popular in traditional Tibetan Buddhism
 "Mahāvastu" – a Lokottaravāda text with parallels to verses in the Pāli Dhammapada's Sahassa Vagga and Bhikkhu Vagga.
 "FaJuJing 法句经" – 4 Chinese works; one of these appears to be an expanded translation of the Pali version; this has not traditionally been very popular.

Comparing the Pali Dhammapada, the Gandhari Dharmapada and the Udanavarga, Brough (2001) identifies that the texts have in common 330 to 340 verses, 16 chapter headings and an underlying structure.  He suggests that the three texts have a "common ancestor" but underlines that there is no evidence that any one of these three texts might have been the "primitive Dharmapada" from which the other two evolved.

The Dhammapada is one of the most popular pieces of Theravada literature.  A critical edition of the Dhammapada was produced by Danish scholar Viggo Fausbøll in 1855, becoming the first Pali text to receive this kind of examination by the European academic community.

Organization 
The Pali Dhammapada contains 423 verses in 26 chapters (listed below in Pali and English).

Excerpts 
The following Pali verses and corresponding English translations are from Ānandajoti (2017), which also contains explanatory footnotes.

English translations 

See also online translations listed in External links below.

 Daniel Gogerly, printed the first English translation of ‘’Dhammapada’’, comprising verses 1-255 in 1840 in Ceylon.
 Tr F. Max Müller, in Buddhist Parables, by E. W. Burlinghame, 1869; reprinted in Sacred Books of the East, volume X, Clarendon/Oxford, 1881; reprinted in Buddhism, by Clarence Hamilton; reprinted separately by Watkins, 2006; reprinted 2008 by Red and Black Publishers, St Petersburg, Florida, ; the first English translation (a Latin translation by V. Fausböll had appeared in 1855)
 Tr J. Gray, American Mission Press, Rangoon, 1881
 Tr J. P. Cooke & O. G. Pettis, Boston (Massachusetts?), 1898
 Hymns of Faith, tr Albert J. Edmunds, Open Court, Chicago, & Kegan Paul, Trench, Trübner & Co., London, 1902
 Tr Norton T. W. Hazeldine, Denver, Colorado, 1902
 The Buddha's Way of Virtue, tr W. D. C. Wagiswara & K. J. Saunders, John Murray, London, 1912
 Tr Silacara, Buddhist Society, London, 1915
 Tr Suriyagoda Sumangala, in Ceylon Antiquary, 1915
 Tr A. P. Buddhadatta, Colombo Apothecaries, 1920?
 The Buddha's Path of Virtue, tr F. L. Woodward, Theosophical Publishing House, London & Madras, 1921
 In Buddhist Legends, tr E. W. Burlinghame, Harvard Oriental Series, 1921, 3 volumes; reprinted by Pali Text Society , Bristol; translation of the stories from the commentary, with the Dhammapada verses embedded
 Tr R. D. Shrikhande and/or P. L. Vaidya (according to different bibliographies; or did one publisher issue two translations in the same year?), Oriental Book Agency, Poona, 1923; includes Pali text
 "Verses on Dhamma", in Minor Anthologies of the Pali Canon, volume I, tr C. A. F. Rhys Davids, 1931, Pali Text Society, Bristol; verse translation; includes Pali text
 Tr N. K. Bhag(w?)at, Buddha Society, Bombay, 1931/5; includes Pali text
 The Way of Truth, tr S. W. Wijayatilake, Madras, 1934
 Tr Irving Babbitt, Oxford University Press, New York & London, 1936; revision of Max Müller
 Tr K. Gunaratana, Penang, Malaya, 1937
 The Path of the Eternal Law, tr Swami Premananda, Self-Realization Fellowship, Washington DC, 1942
 Tr Dhammajoti, Maha Bodhi Society, Benares, 1944
 Comp. Jack Austin, Buddhist Society, London, 1945
 Stories of Buddhist India, tr Piyadassi, 2 volumes, Moratuwa, Ceylon, 1949 & 1953; includes stories from the commentary
 (see article) Tr Sarvepalli Radhakrishnan, Oxford University Press, London, 1950; includes Pali text
 Collection of Verses on the Doctrine of the Buddha, comp Bhadragaka, Bangkok, 1952
 Tr T. Latter, Moulmein, Burma, 1950?
 Tr W. Somalokatissa, Colombo, 1953
 Tr Narada, John Murray, London, 1954
 Tr E. W. Adikaram, Colombo, 1954
 Tr A. P. Buddhadatta, Colombo, 1954; includes Pali text
 Tr Siri Sivali, Colombo, 1954
 Tr ?, Cunningham Press, Alhambra, California, 1955
 Tr C. Kunhan Raja, Theosophical Publishing House, Adyar/Madras, 1956; includes Pali text
 Free rendering and interpretation by Wesley La Violette, Los Angeles, 1956
 Tr Buddharakkhita, Maha Bodhi Society, Bangalore, 1959; 4th edn, Buddhist Publication Society, Kandy, Sri Lanka, 1996; includes Pali text
 Tr Suzanne Karpelès, serialized in Advent (Pondicherry, India), 1960–65; reprinted in Questions and Answers, Collected Works of the Mother, 3, Pondicherry, 1977
 Growing the Bodhi Tree in the Garden of the Heart, tr Khantipalo, Buddhist Association of Thailand, Bangkok, 1966; reprinted as The Path of Truth, Bangkok, 1977
 Tr P. Lal, New York, 1967/70
 Tr Juan Mascaró, Penguin Classics, 1973
 Tr Thomas Byrom, Shambhala, Boston, Massachusetts, & Wildwood House, London, 1976
 Tr Ananda Maitreya, serialized in Pali Buddhist Review, 1 & 2, 1976/7; offprinted under the title Law Verses, Colombo, 1978; revised by Rose Kramer (under the Pali title), originally published by Lotsawa Publications in 1988, reprinted by Parallax Press in 1995
 The Buddha's Words, tr Sathienpong Wannapok, Bangkok, 1979
 Wisdom of the Buddha, tr Harischandra Kaviratna, Pasadena, 1980; includes Pali text
 The Eternal Message of Lord Buddha, tr Silananda, Calcutta, 1982; includes Pali text
 Tr Chhi Med Rig Dzin Lama, Institute of Higher Tibetan Studies, Sarnath, India, 1982; tr from the modern Tibetan translation by dGe-'dun Chos-'phel; includes Pali & Tibetan texts
 Tr & pub Dharma Publishing, Berkeley, California, 1985; tr from the modern Tibetan translation by dGe-'dun Chos-'phel
 Commentary, with text embedded, tr Department of Pali, University of Rangoon, published by Union Buddha Sasana Council, Rangoon (date uncertain; 1980s)
 Tr Daw Mya Tin, Burma Pitaka Association, Rangoon, 1986; probably currently published by the Department for the Promotion and Propagation of the Sasana, Rangoon, and/or Sri Satguru, Delhi
 Path of Righteousness, tr David J. Kalupahana, Universities Press of America, Lanham, Maryland, c. 1986
 Tr Raghavan Iyer, Santa Barbara, 1986; includes Pali text
 (see article) Tr Eknath Easwaran, Arkana, London, 1986/7(); reissued with new material Nilgiri Press 2007, Tomales, CA
 Tr John Ross Carter & Mahinda Palihawadana, Oxford University Press, New York, 1987; the original hardback edition also includes the Pali text and the commentary's explanations of the verses; the paperback reprint in the World's Classics Series omits these
 Tr U. D. Jayasekera, Colombo, 1992
 Treasury of Truth, tr Weragoda Sarada, Taipei, 1993
 Tr Thomas Cleary, Thorsons, London, 1995
 The Word of the Doctrine, tr K. R. Norman, 1997, Pali Text Society, Bristol; the PTS's preferred translation
 Tr Anne Bancroft?, Element Books, Shaftesbury, Dorset, & Richport, Massachusetts, 1997
 The Dhammapada: The Buddha's Path of Wisdom, tr Buddharakkhita, Buddhist Publication Society, 1998.
 The Way of Truth, tr Sangharakshita, Windhorse Publications, Birmingham, 2001
 Tr F. Max Müller (see above), revised Jack Maguire, SkyLight Pubns, Woodstock, Vermont, 2002
 Tr Glenn Wallis, Modern Library, New York, 2004; The Dhammapada: Verses on the Way
 Tr Gil Fronsdal, Shambhala, Boston, Massachusetts, 2005
  Tr Bhikkhu Varado, Inward Path, Malaysia, 2007; Dhammapada in English Verse

Musical settings
  Ronald Corp's 2010 a cappella choral setting of Francis Booth's translation, released on Stone Records

   Dhammapada - Sacred Teachings of the Buddha. Hariprasad Chaurasia & Rajesh Dubey. 2018 - Freespirit Records

Notes

Sources 
 Ānandajoti, Bhikkhu (2007). A Comparative Edition of the Dhammapada. U. of Peradeniya. Ancient Buddhist Texts Retrieved 25 Nov 2008.
 Ānandajoti, Bhikkhu (2017). Dhammapada: Dhamma Verses, 2nd edition. Ancient Buddhist Texts Retrieved 1 May 2022.
 Brough, John (2001). The Gāndhārī Dharmapada. Delhi: Motilal Banarsidass Publishers Private Limited.
 Buswell, Robert E. (ed.) (2003). Encyclopedia of Buddhism. MacMillan Reference Books. .
 Cone, Margaret (transcriber) (1989). "Patna Dharmapada" in the Journal of the Pali Text Society (Vol. XIII), pp. 101–217.  Oxford: PTS. Online text interspersed with Pali parallels compiled by Ānandajoti Bhikkhu (2007). Ancient Buddhist Texts Retrieved 06-15-2008.
 Easwaran, Eknath (2007) (see article). The Dhammapada. Nilgiri Press. .
 Fronsdal, Gil (2005). The Dhammapada. Boston: Shambhala. .
 Geiger, Wilhelm (trans. by Batakrishna Ghosh) (1943, 2004). Pāli Literature and Language. New Delhi: Munshiram Manoharlal Publishers. .
 Harvey, Peter (1990, 2007). An Introduction to Buddhism: Teachings, History and Practices. Cambridge: Cambridge University Press. .
 Hinüber, Oskar von (2000). A Handbook of Pāli Literature. Berlin: Walter de Gruyter. .
 Müller, F. Max (1881). The Dhammapada (Sacred Books Of The East, Vol. X). Oxford University Press.
 Ñāamoli, Bhikkhu (trans.) & Bhikkhu Bodhi (ed.) (2001). The Middle Length Discourses of the Buddha: A Translation of the Majjhima Nikāya. Boston: Wisdom Publications. .
 Rhys Davids, T.W. & William Stede (eds.) (1921-5). The Pali Text Society’s Pali–English Dictionary. Chipstead: Pali Text Society. Search inside the Pali–English Dictionary, University of Chicago

External links

Translations
 Dhammapada, illustrated edition (1993) With stories and commentary, by Ven. Weagoda Sarada Maha Thero [Includes glossary]
 by Max Müller (1881) from Wikisource
 by Sarvepalli Radhakrishnan (1950) Reprint, Oxford University Press (1996)
 by Harischandra Kaviratna (1980)
 by Buddharakkhita (1985) (pdf has intro by Bhikkhu Bodhi)
 by John Richards (1993)
 by Thomas Byrom (1993)
 by Eknath Easwaran (1996)
 by Thanissaro (1997)
 by Gil Fronsdal – Reading by Chapter from The Dhammapada: A New Translation of the Buddhist Classic with Annotations – 2006
 by Bhikkhu Varado and Samanera Bodhesako (2008)
 Detailed word-by-word translation of the Dhammapada, including explanation of grammar
 Multilingual edition of Dhammapada in the Bibliotheca Polyglotta
 Parallel Reading (paragraph granularity) of The Buddha's Path of Wisdom-- Dhammapada (Dhp.)

Voice recordings
 Readings (mp3) from the Dhammapada, translated and read by Gil Fronsdal
 

Khuddaka Nikaya
Buddhist poetry
Buddhist texts